Sara Louise Diamond,  (born 9 March 1954) is a Canadian artist and was the president of OCAD University, Canada.

Life
Born in New York City, US, in 1954, Diamond was raised from 1959 in Toronto, Ontario, Canada, where her father was the executive director of the Jewish Family and Child Service and her mother a professor at the University of Toronto. Diamond has an undergraduate Honours BA in Communications and History from Simon Fraser University, and a master's degree in Digital Media Theory from the University of the Arts, London.

Diamond holds a PhD in computing, information technology and engineering, from the University of East London, England, with a focus on data visualization. Diamond was the artistic director of media and visual art and director of research at the Banff Centre, where she created the Banff New Media Institute in 1995 and led it until 2005. Diamond taught at Emily Carr Institute of Art and Design, at Capilano College, at the California Institute for the Arts and remains an adjunct professor at UCLA.

She is a member of the Royal Canadian Academy of Arts. In 2012 she was made a member of the Order of Ontario.

Career highlights
Founded and led the international Banff New Media institute from 1995–2005, establishing research and commercialization summits of artists, designers, scientists and companies, practice based and research workshops, creative co-productions, laboratories and research in new media. Diamond also led Ontario College of Art and Design University (OCAD U) to retain its traditional strengths in art and design, while transforming the university to become a leader in STEAM+D (Science, Technology, Engineering, Arts, Math, Medicine and Design), with capacities in digital media, design research and curriculum. She initiated and funding the Digital Futures Initiative and the Digital Media Research and Innovation Institute; supported OCAD U's unique research in Inclusive Design and design for health. She collaborated with Indigenous colleagues to develop the Indigenous Visual Culture

Program, with correlative prioritization of Indigenous knowledge and culture at OCAD U.

At OCAD U, Diamond led three strategic plans with resulting scorecards and metrics, new vision and mission, brand development, related academic, research, capital and digital infrastructure strategies and implementation plans, multi-year forecasts. The three projects were: Smart Communities as Platform Co-operatives, Housing Typology Innovations, and Culture Creates Bonds.

Diamond is founding Chair of the Mobile Experience Innovation Centre and current co-chair (with RBC). She is co-principal investigator on the Centre for Information Visualization/Data Driven Design, an OCAD U/York University major initiative and sits on the board of the National Centre of Excellence GRAND. Diamond continues to write and lecture on the subjects of digital media history, digital media, strategic foresight; mobility and design strategy for peer-reviewed journals and acts as a reviewer and evaluator for IEEE and ACM conferences and journals; SSHRC, CFI and the Canada Research Chair programs. Her artwork is held by prestigious collections such as the Museum of Modern Art, NYC and the National Gallery of Canada.

Art career
Diamond's work as an artist was shown in exhibitions including at the National Gallery of Canada, the Museum of Modern Art, and the Vancouver Art Gallery. In 1992, Diamond's work was shown in a retrospective titled Memories Revisited, History Retold, organized by the National Gallery of Canada. During her time as an undergraduate student at Simon Fraser University, Diamond created the Women's Labour History Project, which, beginning in 1978, collected the oral histories of women who were active in the trade union movement, published resources on the women, toured a photo exhibition, and produced videos of the histories. The project is now housed in the Simon Fraser University Archives.

Works

Awards
 2018: Inspiring 50: Advancement of diversity of STEM fields, Government of Netherlands and Senate of Canada 
 2017: Canada 150 Women: Leaders, Champions and Luminaries
 2014: Toronto Life's 50 Most Influential
 2014: Appointed as senior fellow, Massey College, University of Toronto
 2013: Awarded Queen's Diamond Jubilee Medal for significant contributions to
 Canada 
 2013: Awarded Digital Media Pioneer, Grand National Centre of Excellence
 2012: Awarded Order of Ontario
 2009: Nominated and inducted into the Royal Canadian Academy of Art
 2003: CodeZebra – Winner of Canadian Digital Innovation Award
 2002: Educator of the Year – Canadian New Media Awards
 1995: Bell Canada Award in Video Art 1995
 1990: Dean's Medal and gold medal for outstanding achievement in History, History Department, Simon Fraser University 
 1990: The Stephen McIntyre Book Prize, Simon Fraser University

Author's publications

 
 
Diamond, Sara (2005). Participation, Flow, and the Redistribution of Authorship: The Challenges of collaborative Exchange and New Media Curatorial Practice. Museums and the Web 2005: Proceedings, Mar. 31 Spring, 2005.
 
Diamond, Sara; Kibbins, Gary (1998). Total recall: History, memory & new documentary. Vancouver: Satellite Video Exchange Society.

References

Living people
1954 births
American emigrants to Canada
University of California, Los Angeles faculty
Canadian university and college chief executives
Canadian video artists
Women video artists
Members of the Royal Canadian Academy of Arts
Members of the Order of Ontario
Academic staff of OCAD University
Canadian academic administrators
Women heads of universities and colleges
Members of the Order of Canada
Alumni of the University of the Arts London
OCAD University administrators